The Football Association Challenge Cup, commonly known as the FA Cup, is a knockout competition in English association football.  It is the oldest football competition in the world, having commenced in 1871.

Although the competition is the national cup of England, numerous clubs from outside England have participated in the tournament, with some still doing so as of 2016.

Guernsey
Although St. Martins and Vale Recreation have competed in the FA Vase, Guernsey FC are the only club from the Bailiwick of Guernsey to have competed in the FA Cup. Formed in 2011, they first entered the competition in 2013, reaching the 2nd qualifying round. Under FA rules, Guernsey must play any home replay at a neutral English venue – as of 2015, they had played six games in the competition – four away and two 'home' replays in England.

Although sides from Isle of Man and Jersey had competed in the FA Vase, Guernsey FC remained the only club from the crown dependencies to have played in the FA Cup until Jersey Bulls in 2021. The football associations of each crown dependency has County Football Association status within the Football Association.

Ireland
Between 1887–88 and 1890–91, five Irish clubs competed in the FA Cup. In 1887, Distillery became the first club from Ireland to enter the competition. Cliftonville and Linfield Athletic were the last clubs from the island to appear, both competing in 1890–91. Cliftonville progressed further in the competition than any other Irish club, reaching the 3rd round in 1886–87 before crashing out 11–0 to Partick Thistle. Following the introduction of qualifying rounds, Linfield Athletic progressed through the most rounds of any Irish club, winning three ties in 1888–89 to reach the first round proper. Linfield's 7–0 victory over Cliftonville during the 1888–89 fourth qualifying round is notable for being the only FA Cup match ever to be played on Christmas Day.

All five clubs were located in what is now Northern Ireland. However, the entire island of Ireland was still a part of the United Kingdom at the time, as Northern Ireland was not created until the partition of Ireland in 1921.

Jersey
Jersey Bulls are the only club from the Bailiwick of Jersey to have competed in the FA Cup. Formed in 2018, they first entered the competition in 2021, reaching the 3rd qualifying round.

Although a team from the Isle of Man and several other Channel Island teams have competed in the FA Vase, Jersey Bulls and Guernsey FC are the only two clubs from the crown dependencies to have played in the FA Cup. The football associations of each crown dependency has County Football Association status within the Football Association.

Scotland

The first Scottish club to enter was Queen's Park, who accepted an invitation to take part in the very first competition after a number of the clubs which had originally entered withdrew.  The Glasgow team were by far the dominant force in Scottish football, and no other team had even managed to score a goal against them. Because of a combination of byes and the withdrawal of opponents, "Queen's" reached the semi-finals without playing a match, but after holding Wanderers to a draw the Scottish club was forced to withdraw as the funds could not be raised to return for a replay.  The following season Queen's entered the competition again and, to ease the travelling expenses required to take part in a competition in which virtually every other team was based in the home counties, were afforded byes all the way to the semi-finals.  At this stage the club was drawn against Oxford University, whereupon the Scots withdrew from the competition, although one account states that Queen's in fact beat Oxford only to then withdraw as the team could not afford to travel to London for the final.  In 1873, the newly formed Scottish Football Association launched the Scottish Cup, but Queen's Park continued to enter the FA Cup draw, although for unknown reasons the club withdrew each time without playing.

In 1883, Queen's returned to the FA Cup and reached the final, scoring resounding wins over Crewe Alexandra (10–0) and Manchester F.C. (15–0) en route, only to be defeated by Blackburn Rovers. The match against Manchester was the first FA Cup tie to be staged in Scotland, hosted at Titwood, the home of Clydesdale CC.  A year later Queens met Blackburn Rovers in the final once again, with the English team again emerging victorious.  The 1885–86 competition saw the first participation by other Scottish clubs, as Queen's were joined by Partick Thistle, Third Lanark, Rangers and Heart of Midlothian, although the latter two withdrew without playing a match.  These clubs all returned for the 1886–87 competition, along with newcomers Renton and Cowlairs.

In 1887, the Scottish Football Association banned its members from taking any further part in the FA Cup.  No more Scottish clubs participated until Gretna F.C. entered the competition in the 1980s. Because the town of Gretna is located extremely close to the border, the local football club had opted to play in the English football league system and by the 1980s had reached the Northern Premier League, making the team eligible to enter the FA Cup.  Gretna played in the qualifying rounds of the FA Cup for nineteen seasons, making the first round proper twice, until the club joined the Scottish Football League in 2002.

Wales
Until the founding of the League of Wales in 1991, most senior Welsh sides were included within the English league system, and could therefore be eligible for entry into the FA Cup. Since that time, all but a handful of Welsh teams have joined the Welsh league system and are no longer eligible.

References

FA Cup
Expatriated football clubs